Roslina Bakar (born 22 August 1973) is a Malaysian sport shooter.

Bakar competed at the Commonwealth Games in 1998 where she won a bronze medal in the 50m rifle three position event and at the 2002 Games where she won another bronze medal in the same event.

References

1973 births
Living people
Malaysian female sport shooters
Shooters at the 1998 Commonwealth Games
Shooters at the 2002 Commonwealth Games
Commonwealth Games bronze medallists for Malaysia
Commonwealth Games medallists in shooting
Shooters at the 1998 Asian Games
Shooters at the 2002 Asian Games
20th-century Malaysian women
21st-century Malaysian women
Medallists at the 1998 Commonwealth Games
Medallists at the 2002 Commonwealth Games